Mateo Cariño was an Ibaloi chieftain who owned the land that was to become Baguio. He led a successful revolt against the Spanish garrison in La Trinidad and was proclaimed the Capitan Municipal of Baguio by President Emilio Aguinaldo.

Background

He owned vast tracts of land which covered the area which would later be known as Baguio as early as the Spanish colonial period. Titles over the land were given to him by the Spanish colonial government in exchange for his conversion to Christianity. His surname was adopted after his conversion. The land was a rancheria known as Kafagway and was the residence of the Cariño clan and the rest of the Ibaloi community.

In 1901, Cariño was selected as representative of Baguio to chief executive of the US Insular Government over the Philippines.

Cariño reportedly gave Emilio Aguinaldo, President of the Revolutionary Government of the Philippines who was fleeing to Hong Kong, refuge. This is said to have cause the American colonizers who took over the Philippines to issue military decrees that mandated the confiscation of Cariño's lands. Cariño involved himself in a legal dispute seeking for the voiding of the decrees until his death in 1908. He had a favorable posthumous legal victory when the US Supreme Court recognized his "native title" over his lands which was established through testimonies that the land was utilized, owned, and occupied by indigenous populations.

Legacy

The case where Cariño had a legal victory would later serve as the basis for the eponymous "Mateo Cariño" which concerns indigenous rights over ancestral lands.

On August 16, 2010, the city council of Baguio passed a resolution which allotted an vacant area at Burnham Park to a monument honoring Cariño and the Ibaloi people.

Personal life
Mateo Cariño was married to Bayosa Ortega with whom he had nine children.  Bayosa was the only daughter of Enrique Ortega, and the granddaughter of Apulog Minse, both baknangs. Bayosa owned large tracts of land in Kafagway, bought from her ancestors wealth based on gold and cattle trading. Mateo's father was Mawmaw. Mateo expanded the gold trade, introduced rice cultivation and large-scale livestock trading to become the richest baknang. Mateo's older brother was Juan Oraa, who was appointed governor of the Benguet district by President Emilio Aguinaldo.

References

Igorot people
Converts to Roman Catholicism
1908 deaths
1841 births